The Coffeyville Carnegie Public Library Building, located at 415 W. Eighth in Coffeyville, Kansas, is a Carnegie library which was built in 1912.  It was listed on the National Register of Historic Places in 1987.

A library association organized in 1906 obtained a $25,000 Carnegie library grant in 1911.  The library was deemed notable "for its historical association with the Carnegie Corporation Library Building Program and for its architectural significance as a new building type."

It is Classical Revival in style.

It has also been known as the Coffeyville Community College Adult Education Center.

References

Libraries on the National Register of Historic Places in Kansas
Neoclassical architecture in Kansas
Library buildings completed in 1912
Montgomery County, Kansas
Carnegie libraries in Kansas